Serian  is a town in the Khyber Pakhtunkhwa province of Pakistan, it is located at 34°23'60N 72°58'60E. Around 15 minutes of drive from the Shah Maqsood, its surrounded by beautiful mountains around. once a time when snow fall on mountains a view from Haji Safder khan was caputered.

References

Populated places in Khyber Pakhtunkhwa